Ready to drink (often known as RTD) packaged beverages are those sold in a prepared form, ready for consumption.  Examples include iced tea (prepared using tea leaves and fruit juice) and alcopops (prepared by mixing alcoholic beverages with fruit juices or soft drinks).

There are different types of RTD beverages, each serving a different purpose. Here are the most notable ones.

RTD Cocktails 

RTD Cocktails are cocktails that have been pre-batch and bottled or canned. The benefits of having such a drink is that the customer does not need to worry about balance, technique or having multiple ingredients at home. The idea is that the customer will open the cocktail and simply pour and serve.

Alcopops 
Alcopops are mainly ready made alcoholic cocktails that are carbonated and bottled under various brand names.
Alcopops are the most commonly consumed type of RTD in the world after iced tea. Alcopops are banned in some countries due to religious and cultural prohibitions on the consumption of alcohol. A number of studies have linked the marketing of alcopops to increased incidences of underage drinking.

The industry term for this range of products is flavored malt beverage or progressive adult beverage.  The majority sold in the United States are essentially flavored beer.

Alcopops can be based on different types of spirits and liquors, such as vodka-based or rum-based.

A notable type is Lonkero, a Finnish mixed drink of grapefruit soda and gin, introduced as an RTD for the 1952 Olympics, which has continued to be popular in Finland.

Brands 
Alcopop brands are numerous and their alcoholic base vary greatly.
notable brands include:
 Smirnoff Ice
 Mike's Hard Lemonade
 Bacardi Breezer
 Skyy Blue
 Wild Leap Blueberry Vodka
 Jack Daniel's Hard Cola
 MG Spirits
 Vodka Cruiser
 Truly
 White Claw
 Evolve HardPop
 Doc Wylder's

Non-alcoholic beverages
Non-alcoholic RTDs can be further separated into dairy and non-dairy drinks.

 Chocolate milk
 Energy drinks
 Iced tea

See also
Canned coffee

References 

Alcoholic drinks
Drinks